Matthew "Matt" McEwen (born 16 October 1971) is an Australian decathlete.

He won silver at the 2002 Commonwealth Games in Manchester, placed seventh at the 2006 Commonwealth Games in Melbourne and was three times Australian champion.

Competition record

External links 
 
 Matthew 'Matt' McEwen at Australian Athletics Historical Results

1971 births
Living people
Australian decathletes
Commonwealth Games medallists in athletics
Commonwealth Games silver medallists for Australia
Athletes (track and field) at the 2002 Commonwealth Games
Athletes (track and field) at the 2006 Commonwealth Games
Medallists at the 2002 Commonwealth Games